Events from the year 1938 in Taiwan, Empire of Japan.

Incumbents

Central government of Japan
 Prime Minister: Fumimaro Konoe

Taiwan
 Governor-General – Seizō Kobayashi

Births
 17 May – Chang Chun-hung, Member of Legislative Yuan (1993–2005)
 19 June – Wu Cheng-wen, biochemist
 30 June – Hsin Ping, abbot
 10 October – Chang Fu-mei, Minister of Overseas Chinese Affairs Commission (subsequently Overseas Compatriot Affairs Commission) (2000–2008)
 7 November – Tien Hung-mao, Chairman of Straits Exchange Foundation (2016–2018)

References

 
Years of the 20th century in Taiwan